Helmer is a surname of Germanic origin.

Helmer may also refer to:

People
Adam Helmer, American Revolutionary War hero (1754 – 1830)
Bryan Helmer, Canadian ice hockey player (born 1972)
Harry Helmer (1884–1971), American college sports coach
Helmer Hanssen, Norwegian explorer
Helmer Mörner, Swedish equestrian
Robert C. Helmer, 1st President of Baldwin Wallace University
Roger Helmer, British politician (born 1944)
Thomas Helmer, former German footballer (born 1965)
Hermann Helmer (1849 – 1919), German architect

Places
Helmer, Idaho, United States
Helmer, Indiana, United States
Helmer, Michigan, United States
Mount Helmer, on the border of Alberta and British Columbia, Canada

Other uses
Helmer, colloquial term for the showrunner of a television series
"Helmer & Son", 2006 short film directed by Søren Pilmark
Fellner & Helmer, architecture studio founded in 1873 by Austrian architect Ferdinand Fellner and Hermann Helmer.
 Nora and Torvald Helmer, main characters in the play A Doll's House

See also 
Helm (disambiguation)
Hjalmar